Ari Pieti Uolevi Vatanen (born 27 April 1952) is a Finnish rally driver turned politician and a Member of the European Parliament (MEP) from 1999 to 2009. Vatanen won the World Rally Championship drivers' title in 1981 and the Paris Dakar Rally four times. In addition, Vatanen won the 1997 FIA World Cup for Cross-Country Rallies. Since 2013 Vatanen has been the President of the Estonian Autosport Union.

Racing career

His debut year in rallying was 1970, and he debuted in the World Rally Championship at the 1974 1000 Lakes Rally. In that year he won the Nortti Rally in an Opel Ascona, beating Hannu Mikkola in the process, which brought him to wider attention.  His first international rally was the 1975 Rothmans 747 Rally in Jamaica driving a Datsun 120Y. He placed 12th with co-driver Gerry Phillips. At the end of that season he was offered his first professional drive, in a Ford Escort RS1800, on the RAC Rally.  He crashed out on the second day, but by then he had impressed Ford team manager Stuart Turner sufficiently for him to be offered a seat in the team for the British Rally Championship the following year.

In the 1976 Scottish Rally (part of the British Rally Championship), the Ford works team replaced a broken differential in Ari Vatanen's Mk2 Escort RS 1800 with one they removed from a spectator's Ford Capri. It wasn't a spare carried by the service team.  Co-driver Peter Bryant took matters into his own hands by flagging down a passing 3.0-litre Capri and persuading the owner-  Ken Brown from Nottingham- to let them take out his rear diff. and put it in the rally car. Ford competition manager Peter Ashcroft simply gave Mr Brown his business card and told him to take his Capri to the nearest Ford dealer and get a new differential or back axle and send the bill to him.
Ari Vatanen didn't finish the Scottish Rally, but he duly won the championship, a feat he repeated in 1980, co-driven by David Richards, who went on to become chairman of Prodrive, the Banbury based motorsport team and one of the most influential figures in British (and worldwide) motorsport.  Between 1977 and 1980 he also competed on selected World Championship events, initially for the official Ford team and then, after its withdrawal from the sport at the end of 1979, for the semi-private Rothmans Rally Team. He took his debut win at the 1980 Acropolis Rally and became the World Rally Champion in 1981. He remains the only privateer driver (i.e. not driving for an official factory team) to have achieved this feat.

Vatanen and Richards parted ways for the 1982 season, and for the next few years Vatanen was co-driven by Terry Harryman.  He did not defend his world title in 1982, competing instead in the British Championship in a Ford Escort, before moving to the Opel team for 1983.  The Opel Ascona and Opel Manta were only two-wheel-drive and not fully competitive, but Vatanen still managed to win the Safari Rally.

In 1984, Vatanen signed to drive the Peugeot 205 T16 for Peugeot's factory team. From the 1984 1000 Lakes Rally to 1985 Swedish Rally, Vatanen won five world rallies in a row. He was tipped to win the 1985 world title, but at mid-season was trailing his teammate Timo Salonen after a series of accidents and mechanical problems.  He then had a serious accident on the Rally Argentina, when his car somersaulted at over 120 mph.  His seat broke, and he was thrown around inside the car, suffering severe injuries to his legs and torso and life-threatening internal bleeding.  He spent 18 months recovering first from his physical injuries, and then from severe depression. He went on to make a complete recovery and his return to motorsport in 1987 saw him go on to win the Paris-Dakar Rally four times; with Peugeot in 1987, 1989 and 1990, and with Citroën in 1991. He became the centre of controversy when his car was stolen whilst leading the same rally in 1988.

In 1997 he won the FIA World Cup for Cross-Country Rallies with a Citroën ZX Rallye-raid alongside navigator Fred Gallagher (co-driver).

With Peugeot, Vatanen also won the Pikes Peak International Hillclimb, after Peugeot stopped participating in the World Rally Championship in 1986, due to the demise of Group B rallying. Peugeot used the lessons learnt from its 205 T16 to create the 405 T16. With at least , large aerofoils, four-wheel drive and four-wheel steering, Vatanen took the car up the hill in record time, his efforts being captured in the award-winning short film Climb Dance.

Vatanen's autobiography Every Second Counts, detailing his life and career up until that point, was published in 1988 (SAF Publishing) and instantly became a best seller.

Vatanen continued competing in the World Rally Championship more or less actively until the 1998 season. He drove for Mitsubishi Ralliart Europe in four events in 1989 and in five events in 1990. His best result with the Mitsubishi Galant VR-4 was second at the 1990 1000 Lakes Rally. From 1992 to 1993, he competed for Subaru in 11 events, finishing second three times, including on the debut event of the first Subaru Impreza in Finland. Vatanen briefly led the event before being overhauled by eventual winner Juha Kankkunen. Even so, he was dropped by the Subaru team at the end of the 1993 season in favour of Carlos Sainz.

The following year he returned to the wheel of a Ford, driving the Ford Escort RS Cosworth for a semi-private team, and then being co-opted into the Ford factory team where he stood in for the injured Francois Delecour. His most notable result that year was a podium finish on Rally Argentina, the first time he had contested the event since his accident there nine years previously.

The 1995 and 1996 seasons were quiet for Vatanen, whose career as a top-line driver was slowly drawing to a close. At the time there was a surplus of drivers and those late in their careers, such as Vatanen, tended to lose out in favour of younger talents. Nevertheless, he continued to contest a few events then and in subsequent years, his best result being a podium finish at the 1998 Safari Rally. He then briefly returned to a works Subaru for the season-ending Rally of Great Britain, marking his 100th World Rally Championship event.

Although he became much less active in rallying, his hunger for motorsport had not left him completely however, and Vatanen joined Nissan in the Paris-Dakar in 2003, finishing seventh. He also made an appearance at the 2003 Rally Finland with a Bozian Racing-prepared Peugeot 206 WRC, and finished eleventh. In 2004 and 2005, Vatanen drove the Dakar for Nissan as well, and in 2007 he made another attempt with Volkswagen, but retired on the seventh stage.

He currently holds the position of 'Club Patron' to the Ireland's Donegal Motor Club since 2002. He has a long association with the Donegal Motor Club and the Donegal International Rally, competing twice early in his career, 1975 and 1978.

Despite having no roots in Estonia, in January 2013 Vatanen was named as the candidate of presidency by the board of the Estonian Autosport Union to become first foreign President of the authority. Vatanen said he had always been in good relations with Estonians and he's deeply impressed by the achievements of such a small country. Rumours said that the other candidate will be Estonia's most famous former rally driver Markko Märtin. Without any rival candidate Vatanen was elected President of the Estonian Autosport Union.

In September 2008, Vatanen took part in the Colin McRae Forest Stages Rally, a round of the Scottish Rally Championship centred in Perth in Scotland. His co-driver was once again David Richards and they competed in the same Rothmans sponsored Ford Escort RS1800 that they drove in 1981. He was one of a number of ex-world champions to take part in the event in memory of McRae, who died in 2007.

Personal life
Vatanen was born and grew up in rural Tuupovaara in Eastern Finland. He is married to Rita and has four children, Kim (b. 1972), Ria (b. 1980), Tua (b. 1982) and Max (b. 1990). They have homes in Finland and France.
Kim is the manager of current WRC driver Sébastien Ogier. In 2016 Max followed his fathers footsteps by entering the British Rally Championship driving an M-Sport prepared Ford Fiesta R5.

In 1993, Vatanen settled in southern France, where he bought a farm and a winery.

Vatanen speaks fluent Finnish, English, and French.

Political career

In 1999, Vatanen was elected to the European Parliament from the list of the conservative Finnish National Coalition party although he continued to live in France. The issues on which he worked included car taxation, traffic policies, development aid and agricultural policy.

In 2004, he was re-elected, this time from the list of the conservative French Union for a Popular Movement. In the 2009 European Parliament elections. Vatanen was again a National Coalition candidate in Finland, but he did not get elected this time.

In July 2009, Vatanen declared his interest in being a candidate to stand against Max Mosley in the FIA presidential elections in October if Mosley decide to stand for another term as president. Vatanen later confirmed that he would run for the presidency. On 23 October 2009, Vatanen failed in his bid to be elected as president of the FIA, which was won by his former team boss at Peugeot, subsequently Scuderia Ferrari manager Jean Todt.

Vatanen is a signatory of the Prague Declaration on European Conscience and Communism.

WRC victories
{|class="wikitable"
! Number
! Event
! Season
! Co-driver
! Car
|-
| 1
|  Acropolis Rally
| 1980
|rowspan=4 | David Richards
|rowspan=4 | Ford Escort RS1800
|-
| 2
|  Acropolis Rally
|rowspan=3 | 1981
|-
| 3
|  Rallye do Brasil
|-
| 4
|  1000 Lakes Rally
|-
| 5
|  Safari Rally
| 1983
|rowspan=6 | Terry Harryman
| Opel Ascona 400
|-
| 6
|  1000 Lakes Rally
|rowspan=3 | 1984
|rowspan=5 | Peugeot 205 Turbo 16
|-
| 7
|  Rallye Sanremo
|-
| 8
|  RAC Rally
|-
| 9
|  Rallye Automobile de Monte-Carlo
|rowspan=2 | 1985
|-
| 10
|  Swedish Rally
|}

WRC results

Dakar Rally results

References

External links
 Ari Vatanen's official website
 
 Profile at RallyBase
 http://www.europeanvoice.com/article/imported/profile-rallying-to-a-new-cause-ari-vatanen/45453.aspx (Ari Vatanen's Profile)

1952 births
Dakar Rally drivers
Dakar Rally winning drivers
Finnish rally drivers
Finnish sportsperson-politicians
Living people
MEPs for Finland 1999–2004
MEPs for South-East France 2004–2009
National Coalition Party MEPs
Off-road racing drivers
People from Tuupovaara
Union for a Popular Movement MEPs
World Rally Champions
World Rally Championship drivers
Finnish expatriates in France
Citroën Racing drivers
Peugeot Sport drivers
Volkswagen Motorsport drivers